Waste-to-energy (WtE) or energy-from-waste (EfW) is the process of generating energy in the form of electricity and/or heat from the primary treatment of waste, or the processing of waste into a fuel source. WtE is a form of energy recovery. Most WtE processes generate electricity and/or heat directly through combustion, or produce a combustible fuel commodity, such as methane, methanol, ethanol or synthetic fuels.

History

The first incinerator or "Destructor" was built in Nottingham, UK, in 1874 by Manlove, Alliott & Co. Ltd. to the design of Alfred Fryer.

The first US incinerator was built in 1885 on Governors Island in New York, New York.

The first waste incinerator in Denmark was built in 1903 in Frederiksberg.

The first facility in the Czech Republic was built in 1905 in Brno.

Gasification and pyrolysis processes have been known and used for centuries and for coal  as  early  as the 18th century.... Development technologies for processing [residual solid mixed waste] has only become a focus of  attention in recent years stimulated by the search for more efficient energy recovery. (2004)

Methods

Incineration

Incineration, the combustion of organic material such as waste with energy recovery, is the most common WtE implementation. All new WtE plants in OECD countries incinerating waste (residual MSW, commercial, industrial or RDF) must meet strict emission standards, including those on nitrogen oxides (NOx), sulphur dioxide (SO2), heavy metals and dioxins. Hence, modern incineration plants are vastly different from old types, some of which neither recovered energy nor materials. Modern incinerators reduce the volume of the original waste by 95-96 percent, depending upon composition and degree of recovery of materials such as metals from the ash for recycling.

Incinerators may emit fine particulate, heavy metals, trace dioxin and acid gas, even though these emissions are relatively low from modern incinerators. Other concerns include proper management of residues: toxic fly ash, which must be handled in hazardous waste disposal installation as well as incinerator bottom ash (IBA), which must be reused properly.

Critics argue that incinerators destroy valuable resources and they may reduce incentives for recycling. The question, however, is an open one, as European countries which recycle the most (up to 70%) also incinerate to avoid landfilling.

Incinerators have electric efficiencies of 14-28%. In order to avoid losing the rest of the energy, it can be used for e.g. district heating (cogeneration). The total efficiencies of cogeneration incinerators are typically higher than 80% (based on the lower heating value of the waste).

The method of incineration to convert municipal solid waste (MSW) is a relatively old method of WtE generation. Incineration generally entails burning waste (residual MSW, commercial, industrial and RDF) to boil water which powers steam generators that generate electric energy and heat to be used in homes, businesses, institutions and industries. One problem associated is the potential for pollutants to enter the atmosphere with the flue gases from the boiler.  These pollutants can be acidic and in the 1980s were reported to cause environmental degradation by turning rain into acid rain.  Modern incinerators incorporate carefully engineered primary and secondary burn chambers, and controlled burners designed to burn completely with the lowest possible emissions, eliminating, in some cases, the need for lime scrubbers and electro-static precipitators on smokestacks.

By passing the smoke through the basic lime scrubbers, any acids that might be in the smoke are neutralized which prevents the acid from reaching the atmosphere and hurting the environment. Many other devices, such as fabric filters, reactors, and catalysts destroy or capture other regulated pollutants. According to the New York Times, modern incineration plants are so clean that "many times more dioxin is now released from home fireplaces and backyard barbecues than from incineration. " According to the German Environmental Ministry, "because of stringent regulations, waste incineration plants are no longer significant in terms of emissions of dioxins, dust, and heavy metals".

Compared with other waste to energy technologies, incineration seems to be the most attractive due to its higher power production efficiency, lower investment costs, and lower emission rates. Additionally, incineration yields the highest amount of electricity with the highest capacity to lessen pile of wastes in landfills through direct combustion.

Fuel from plastics
One process that is used to convert plastic into fuel is pyrolysis, the thermal decomposition of materials at high temperatures in an inert atmosphere. It involves change of chemical composition and is mainly used for treatment of organic materials. In large scale production, plastic waste is ground and melted and then pyrolyzed. Catalytic converters help in the process. The vapours are condensed with oil or fuel and accumulated in settling tanks and filtered. Fuel is obtained after homogenation and can be used for automobiles and machinery. It is commonly termed as thermofuel or energy from plastic.

A new process uses a two-part catalyst, cobalt and zeolite, to convert plastics into propane. It works on polyethylene and polypropylene and the propane yield is approximately 80%.

Other
There are a number of other new and emerging technologies that are able to produce energy from waste and other fuels without direct combustion. Many of these technologies have the potential to produce more electric power from the same amount of fuel than would be possible by direct combustion. This is mainly due to the separation of corrosive components (ash) from the converted fuel, thereby allowing higher combustion temperatures in e.g. boilers, gas turbines, internal combustion engines, fuel cells. Some are able to efficiently convert the energy into liquid or gaseous fuels:

Thermal treatment technologies: 
Gasification: produces combustible gas, hydrogen, synthetic fuels
Thermal depolymerization: produces synthetic crude oil, which can be further refined
Pyrolysis: produces combustible tar/biooil and chars
Plasma arc gasification or plasma gasification process (PGP): produces rich syngas including hydrogen and carbon monoxide usable for fuel cells or generating electricity to drive the plasma arch, usable vitrified silicate and metal ingots, salt and sulphur

Non-thermal technologies: 
Anaerobic digestion: Biogas rich in methane
Fermentation production: examples are ethanol, lactic acid, hydrogen
Mechanical biological treatment (MBT)
MBT + Anaerobic digestion
MBT to Refuse derived fuel

Global developments

During the 2001–2007 period, the waste-to-energy capacity increased by about four million metric tons per year.

Japan and China each built several plants based on direct smelting or on fluidized bed combustion of solid waste. In China there were about 434 waste-to-energy plants in early 2016. Japan is the largest user in thermal treatment of municipal solid waste in the world, with 40 million tons.

Some of the newest plants use stoker technology and others use the advanced oxygen enrichment technology. Several treatment plants exist worldwide using relatively novel processes such as direct smelting, the Ebara fluidization process and the Thermoselect JFE gasification and melting technology process.

As of June 2014, Indonesia had a total of 93.5 MW installed capacity of waste-to-energy, with a pipeline of projects in different preparation phases together amounting to another 373MW of capacity.

Biofuel Energy Corporation of Denver, Colorado, opened two new biofuel plants in Wood River, Nebraska, and Fairmont, Minnesota, in July 2008. These plants use distillation to make ethanol for use in motor vehicles and other engines.  Both plants are currently reported to be working at over 90% capacity. Fulcrum BioEnergy incorporated located in Pleasanton, California, is building a WtE plant near Reno, NV. The plant is scheduled to open in 2019 under the name of Sierra BioFuels plant. BioEnergy incorporated predicts that the plant will produce approximately 10.5 million gallons per year of ethanol from nearly 200,000 tons per year of MSW.

Waste to energy technology includes fermentation, which can take biomass and create ethanol, using waste cellulosic or organic material. In the fermentation process, the sugar in the waste is converted to carbon dioxide and alcohol, in the same general process that is used to make wine. Normally fermentation occurs with no air present. 

Esterification can also be done using waste to energy technologies, and the result of this process is biodiesel. The cost effectiveness of esterification will depend on the feedstock being used, and all the other relevant factors such as transportation distance, amount of oil present in the feedstock, and others.
Gasification and pyrolysis by now can reach gross thermal conversion efficiencies (fuel to gas) up to 75%, however a complete combustion is superior in terms of fuel conversion efficiency. Some pyrolysis processes need an outside heat source which may be supplied by the gasification process, making the combined process self-sustaining.

Carbon dioxide emissions
In thermal WtE technologies, nearly all of the carbon content in the waste is emitted as carbon dioxide to the atmosphere (when including final combustion of the products from pyrolysis and gasification; except when producing biochar for fertilizer).

In the event that the waste was landfilled,  of MSW would produce approximately  methane via the anaerobic decomposition of the biodegradable part of the waste. In some countries, large amounts of landfill gas are collected. However, there is still the global warming potential of the landfill gas being emitted to atmosphere. For example, in the US in 1999 landfill gas emission was approximately 32% higher than the amount of  that would have been emitted by combustion.

In addition, nearly all biodegradable waste is biomass. That is, it has biological origin. This material has been formed by plants using atmospheric  typically within the last growing season. If these plants are regrown the  emitted from their combustion will be taken out from the atmosphere once more.

Such considerations are the main reason why several countries administrate WtE of the biomass part of waste as renewable energy. The rest—mainly plastics and other oil and gas derived products—is generally treated as non-renewables.

Determination of the biomass fraction
MSW to a large extent is of biological origin (biogenic), e.g. paper, cardboard, wood, cloth, food scraps. Typically half of the energy content in MSW is from biogenic material. Consequently, this energy is often recognised as renewable energy according to the waste input.

Several methods have been developed by the European CEN 343 working group to determine the biomass fraction of waste fuels, such as Refuse Derived Fuel/Solid Recovered Fuel. The initial two methods developed (CEN/TS 15440) were the manual sorting method and the selective dissolution method. A detailed systematic comparison of these two methods was published in 2010. Since each method suffered from limitations in properly characterizing the biomass fraction, two alternative methods have been developed.

The first method uses the principles of radiocarbon dating. A technical review (CEN/TR 15591:2007) outlining the carbon 14 method was published in 2007. A technical standard of the carbon dating method (CEN/TS 15747:2008) is published in 2008. In the United States, there is already an equivalent carbon 14 method under the standard method ASTM D6866.

The second method (so-called balance method) employs existing data on materials composition and operating conditions of the WtE plant and calculates the most probable result based on a mathematical-statistical model. Currently the balance method is installed at three Austrian and eight Danish incinerators.

A comparison between both methods carried out at three full-scale incinerators in Switzerland showed that both methods came to the same results.

Carbon 14 dating can determine with precision the biomass fraction of waste, and also determine the biomass calorific value. Determining the calorific value is important for green certificate programs such as the Renewable Obligation Certificate program in the United Kingdom. These programs award certificates based on the energy produced from biomass. Several research papers, including the one commissioned by the Renewable Energy Association in the UK, have been published that demonstrate how the carbon 14 result can be used to calculate the biomass calorific value. The UK gas and electricity markets authority, Ofgem, released a statement in 2011 accepting the use of Carbon 14 as a way to determine the biomass energy content of waste feedstock under their administration of the Renewables Obligation. Their Fuel Measurement and Sampling (FMS) questionnaire describes the information they look for when considering such proposals.

Environmental impact
A 2019 report commissioned by the Global Alliance for Incinerator Alternatives (GAIA), done by the Tishman Environment and Design Center at The New School, found that 79% of the then 73 operating waste-to-energy facilities in the U.S. are located in low-income communities and/or "communities of color", because "of historic residential, racial segregation and expulsive zoning laws that allowed whiter, wealthier communities to exclude industrial uses and people of color from their boundaries.". In Chester, Pennsylvania, where a community group is actively opposing their local waste-to-energy facility, Sintana Vergara, an assistant professor in the Department of Environmental Resources Engineering at Humboldt State University in California, commented that community resistance is based on both the pollution and the fact that many of these facilities have been sited in communities without any community input, and without any benefits to the community.

Notable examples
According to a 2019 United Nations Environment Programme report, there are 589 WtE plants in Europe and 82 in the United States.

The following are some examples of WtE plants.

Waste incineration WtE plants
 Essex County Resource Recovery Facility, Newark, New Jersey
 Harrisburg incinerator, Harrisburg, Pennsylvania
 Lee County Solid Waste Resource Recovery Facility, Fort Myers, Florida, USA (1994)
 Montgomery County Resource Recovery Facility in Dickerson, Maryland, USA (1995)
 Spittelau (1971), and Flötzersteig (1963), Vienna, Austria (Wien Energie)
 SYSAV waste-to-energy plant in Malmö (2003 and 2008), Sweden
 Algonquin Power, Brampton, Ontario, Canada
 Stoke Incinerator, Stoke-on-Trent, UK (1989)
 Delaware Valley Resource Recovery Facility, Chester, United States
 Teesside EfW plant near Middlesbrough, North East England (1998)
 Edmonton Incinerator in Greater London, England (1974)
 Burnaby Waste-to-Energy Facility, Metro Vancouver, Canada (1988)
 Timarpur-Okhla Waste to Energy Plant, New Delhi, India
 East Delhi Waste Processing Company Limited, New Delhi, India

Liquid fuel producing plants

A single plant is currently under construction:

Enerkem Waste to Biofuels and Chemicals Facility, located in Edmonton, Alberta, Canada based on the Enerkem-process, fueled by MSW.

Plasma Gasification Waste-to-Energy plants

The US Air Force once tested a Transportable Plasma Waste to Energy System (TPWES) facility (PyroGenesis technology) at Hurlburt Field, Florida. The plant, which cost $7.4 million to construct, was closed and sold at a government liquidation auction in May 2013, less than three years after its commissioning.  The opening bid was $25.  The winning bid was sealed.

Besides large plants, domestic waste-to-energy incinerators also exist. For example, the Refuge de Sarenne has a domestic waste-to-energy plant. It is made by combining a wood-fired gasification boiler with a Stirling motor.

Australia 
Renergi will scale up their system of converting waste organic materials into liquid fuels using a thermal treatment process in Collie, Western Australia. The system will process 1.5 tonnes of organic matter per hour. Annually the facility will divert 4000 tonnes of municipal waste from landfill and source an additional 8000 tonnes of organic waste from agricultural and forestry operations. Renergi’s patented “grinding pyrolysis” process aims to converts organic materials into biochar, bio-gases and bio-oil by applying heat in an environment with limited oxygen.

Another project in the Rockingham Industrial Zone, roughly 45 kilometres south of Perth will see a 29 MW plant built with capacity to power 40,000 homes from an annual feedstock of 300,000 tonnes of municipal, industrial and commercial rubbish. As well as supplying electricity to the South West Interconnected System, 25 MW of the plant’s output has already been committed under a power purchase agreement.

See also

Biogas
Biohydrogen production
Cogeneration
Energy recycling
Landfill gas utilization
List of solid waste treatment technologies
List of waste management acronyms
Manure-derived synthetic crude oil
Plastic pollution
Refuse-derived fuel
Relative cost of electricity generated by different sources
Reuse of human excreta
Waste-to-energy plant

References

Further reading 
 Field, Christopher B. "Emissions pathways, climate change, and impacts." PNAS 101.34 (2004): 12422–12427.
 
 Tilman, David. "Environmental, economic, and energetic costs." PNAS 103.30 (2006): 11206–11210.

External links

Waste-to-Energy Research and Technology Council 
Energy Recovery from the Combustion of Municipal Solid Waste - US EPA
WtERT Germany
Gasification Technologies Council 

Bioenergy
Waste management
Waste treatment technology
Industrial gases